Mimatybe pauliani is a species of beetle in the family Cerambycidae, and the only species in the genus Mimatybe. It was described by Breuning in 1957.

References

Apomecynini
Beetles described in 1957
Monotypic beetle genera